Gagea peduncularis is a Mediterranean plant species  in the lily family. It is native to Italy (Apulia), Greece (including Crete), the Balkans, Turkey, Cyprus, and Libya.

Gagea peduncularis is a bulb-forming perennial herb. Flowers look yellow from the front, green from the back.

References

External links
Greece's Flora, Yellow star of Bethlehem (Gagea peduncularis)  in English with color photo
Cretan Flora, Gagea peduncularis  in English with color photo
Flora Attica, Gagea peduncularis - Γαγέα η έμμισχος   in Greek with color photo

peduncularis
Plants described in 1822
Taxa named by Carl Borivoj Presl